Pseudodiopsis is a genus of stalk-eyed flies in the family Diopsidae.

Species
P. bipunctipennis (Senior-White, 1922)
P. detrahens (Walker, 1860)

References

Diopsidae
Diptera of Asia
Diopsoidea genera